Caren Kaye is a retired American television and film actress who has appeared in dozens of films and guest-starred in many TV series. She is best known for her roles in the 1983 film My Tutor and the short-lived sitcoms The Betty White Show (1977–1978), Who's Watching the Kids? (1978), and It's Your Move (1984–1985).

Early years and education 
Born in New York City on March 12, 1951 Kaye was educated at the High School of Performing Arts and Carnegie Mellon University. In the early 1970s, she studied and practiced the improvisational games created by Viola Spolin.

Career 
From college, Kaye went to Europe, where she performed in avante-garde theater and drove a taxi. After she returned to New York, she co-founded the War Babies comedy troupe.

One of Kaye's early roles was in a training film for the United States Navy about a young woman going through basic training. During the mid-1970s, she guest-starred in episodes of Alice, The Mary Tyler Moore Show, Rhoda, and The Practice. She played Bambi Benton on Blansky's Beauties, a spin-off of Happy Days, which aired from February to June 1977. In September 1977, she co-starred in a similar role as a regular on The Betty White Show, which lasted one season.

Her film credits include Looking for Mr. Goodbar (1977), Cuba Crossing (1980), Some Kind of Hero (1982), My Tutor (1983), Teen Witch (1989) and Satan's Princess (1990).

In 1984, Kaye co-starred as the mother of Jason Bateman and girlfriend of David Garrison in the teen comedy It's Your Move. This series lasted one season.

She was featured in six episodes of The Love Boat and has guest-starred in 21 Jump Street, Mr. Belvedere, Fantasy Island, Simon & Simon, Matt Houston, Taxi and Murder, She Wrote.

Personal life 
Kaye married actor Renny Temple, who performed with her in the War Babies troupe, and they have one child.

Filmography

Film

Television

References

External links

American film actresses
American television actresses
Actresses from New York City
Carnegie Mellon University alumni
Living people
21st-century American women
Year of birth missing (living people)